Top Chef: Boston is the twelfth season of the American reality television series Top Chef. The season was formally announced on August 20, 2014, and premiered on October 15, 2014. Filming for Season 12 took place from May through June 2014 in locations around Boston, Massachusetts, concluding with a finale in San Miguel de Allende, Guanajuato and the surrounding area. Top Chef: Chicago finalist and Top Chef: All-Stars winner Richard Blais debuted as a recurring judge, joining Tom Colicchio, Gail Simmons, Hugh Acheson, and host Padma Lakshmi on the judging panel. Last Chance Kitchen also returned for its fourth season, beginning with a two-part redemption mid-season and continuing until the first part of the finale. In the season finale, Mei Lin was declared the winner over runner-up Gregory Gourdet. Unlike previous seasons, no Fan Favorite vote was held.

Production
According to reports by Deadline Hollywood, members of Boston's local Teamsters Union allegedly harassed and intimidated Lakshmi and other Top Chef staff during the production's June film shoot at the Steel & Rye restaurant in Milton, Massachusetts. The Teamsters Local 25, upset that Bravo hired non-union personnel to drive cast and crew around Milton, protested the filming, threatening staff using racist, sexist, and homophobic language, and slashing the tires of several crew-owned vehicles. While the network insisted the incident was isolated, sources for The Boston Globe reported that the threats did prompt Bravo to change the locations of some tapings. Teamsters Local 25 later released a statement denying the allegations. Four Teamsters were then indicted on charges of conspiracy to extort, attempted extortion, and aiding and abetting. The trial began on August 1, 2017. On August 15, 2017, a jury acquitted the four Teamsters of all charges.

Contestants
Sixteen chefs were selected to compete in Top Chef: Boston.

Katsuji Tanabe returned to compete in Top Chef: Charleston. Tanabe also appeared as a contestant on the first season of Top Chef México, the Mexican version of Top Chef from NBC Universo. Gregory Gourdet and Melissa King returned for Top Chef: All-Stars L.A.

Contestant progress

: The chef(s) did not receive immunity for winning the Quickfire Challenge.
: George lost the Sudden Death Quickfire Challenge and was eliminated.
: Katie lost the Sudden Death Quickfire Challenge against George. As a result, George was reinstated into the competition.
: There were no eliminations in Episode 11.
: Doug won Last Chance Kitchen and returned to the competition.
 (WINNER) The chef won the season and was crowned "Top Chef".
 (RUNNER-UP) The chef was a runner-up for the season.
 (WIN) The chef won the Elimination Challenge.
 (HIGH) The chef was selected as one of the top entries in the Elimination Challenge, but did not win.
 (IN) The chef was not selected as one of the top or bottom entries in the Elimination Challenge and was safe.
 (LOW) The chef was selected as one of the bottom entries in the Elimination Challenge, but was not eliminated.
 (OUT) The chef lost the Elimination Challenge.

Episodes

Last Chance Kitchen

References
Notes

Footnotes

External links
 Official website

Top Chef
Television shows set in Boston
Television shows filmed in Boston
Television shows filmed in Massachusetts
Television shows filmed in Mexico
2014 American television seasons
2015 American television seasons